Hans Boersma (born 1961) is a Dutch-Canadian Reformed theologian, specialising in patristics, sacramental theology, and nouvelle théologie.

Biography 
Boersma holds degrees from the University of Lethbridge, the Theological College of the Canadian Reformed Churches, and Utrecht University.

He previously taught at Trinity Western University in Langley, BC (1999–2005) and served as the J. I. Packer Professor of Theology at Regent College from 2005 to 2019. Boersma held the Danforth Visiting Chair at St. Louis University from 2015 to 2016. He currently holds the Chair to the Order of St. Benedict Servants of Christ Endowed Professorship in Ascetical Theology at Nashotah House, a theological seminary in the Anglo-Catholic tradition.

From 2003 until 2004, Boersma was the President of the Canadian-American Theological Association, a forum for scholarly contributions to the renewal of theology and biblical interpretation.

Works 
 Seeing God: The Beatific Vision in Christian Tradition (Eerdmans, 2018)
 Scripture as Real Presence: Sacramental Exegesis in the Early Church (Baker Academic, 2017)
 Sacramental Preaching: Sermons on the Hidden Presence of Christ (Baker, 2016)
 The Oxford Handbook of Sacramental Theology, ed. Hans Boersma and Matthew Levering (Oxford University Press, 2015)
 Embodiment and Virtue in Gregory of Nyssa: An Anagogical Approach (Oxford University Press, 2013)
 Heaven on Earth? Theological Interpretation in Ecumenical Dialogue, ed. Hans Boersma and Matthew Levering (Wiley-Blackwell, 2013)
 Heavenly Participation: The Weaving of a Sacramental Tapestry (Eerdmans, 2011)
 Nouvelle Théologie & Sacramental Ontology: A Return to Mystery (Oxford University Press, 2010)
 Violence, Hospitality, and the Cross: Reappropriating the Atonement Tradition (Baker, 2006)  — Christianity Today 2005 Book Award Winner
 Eucharistic Participation: The Reconfiguration of Time and Space (Regent College Publishing, 2013)

References

External links 
 
 Audio recordings at Regent College

Living people
1961 births
University of Lethbridge alumni
Utrecht University alumni
Academic staff of Trinity Western University
Patristic scholars
21st-century Calvinist and Reformed theologians
Canadian Calvinist and Reformed theologians
Academic staff of Regent College
Members of the Royal Netherlands Academy of Arts and Sciences